Parasada is a monotypic moth genus of the family Noctuidae. Its only species, Parasada carnosa, is found in Sri Lanka and Japan. Both the genus and species were first described by George Hampson, the genus in 1910, and the species in 1893.

References

Acontiinae
Monotypic moth genera